Cahilty Lake is a lake in British Columbia, Canada.

See also
Heffley Creek, British Columbia

References

Lakes of British Columbia
Thompson Country
Kamloops Division Yale Land District